An Giang University (AGU) is a Vietnamese public university based in the city of Long Xuyen in An Giang Province. With over 10,000 enrolled students annually, it is one of the major educational and research institutions in the Mekong Delta region of Vietnam.

History

In 1975, the school opened as a Teacher Training College. In 1999, it was re-established as the second university in the then-rural Mekong Delta region of Vietnam,  with the purpose of serving the provinces of An Giang, Kiên Giang, and Đồng Tháp.  Agriculturalist Dr. Võ Tòng Xuân was appointed as its first rector. 
With the rapid expansion of the school, news spread about the possible sale and privatization of the school, with school leadership denying the information as rumors in 2015. In 2019, the university became officially affiliated as a member of the VNUHCM network of universities.

The current rector is Dr. Võ Văn Thắng. AGU has 10,003 students and 815 staff members and lecturers.

Campus
For much of its existence, the university was a single campus near the developing downtown of Long Xuyen.  In 2009, the university opened its north campus, which would serve as the school's primary headquarters. Due to its size and central location, the campus sometimes serves as a central meeting ground for the city festivals and expositions.

Academics

AGU has six main schools housing 36 departments and 57 degree programs.

Schools
AGU has six main schools: 
 School of Education
 School of Agriculture and Natural Resources
 School of Technology and Environment
 School of Economics and Business Management
 School of Culture and Arts
 School of Philosophy

Institutional Partnerships

An Giang University has a number of partnerships both domestic and international, with universities, non-governmental organizations, and corporations.

Student life
The University has on-campus dormitories.  There is an electronic newspaper produced by and for the student body.  There multiple student organizations and clubs on-campus.

Notable Alumni and Faculty
 Dr. Võ Tòng Xuân

References

External links
An Giang University official site

Long Xuyen
Universities in Vietnam
Buildings and structures in An Giang province